Nicoletella is a Gram-negative and non-motile genus of bacteria from the family of Pasteurellaceae with one known species (Nicoletella semolina). Nicoletella semolina has been isolated from the trachea of a horse from Bern in Switzerland.

References

Further reading 
 

Pasteurellales
Bacteria genera
Monotypic bacteria genera